The Albanian National Army (ANA; , AKSh), is an Albanian paramilitary organization which operates in North Macedonia, Serbia and Kosovo. The group opposes the Ohrid Framework Agreement which ended the 2001 insurgency in Macedonia between members of the National Liberation Army and Macedonian security forces.

History
It was formed in 2001 in Macedonia. The organization is associated with FBKSh (National Front for Reunification of Albanians), its political wing.

The ANA appeared in Kosovo in 2003, where on March 7, two members trying to detonate a bomb were shot and killed by Serbian police. In 2007, a video was aired by Kosovar television stations depicting a band of medium-armed, masked individuals intercepting cars. In October 2007 the unit declared it would seize the Serb exclave of North Kosovo by force if the Kosovo Protection Force did not occupy it by November 1, 2007. The ANA has claimed that it is patrolling North Kosovo to prevent incursions by the Czar Lazar Guard.

In early November 2007, insurgents of the "Political Advisory Body of the Kosovo Liberation Army" suffered a minor crackdown, dubbed Operation Mountain Storm by the Macedonian armed forces in north-western Macedonia. According to Macedonian authorities; six members of the KLA were killed.

On November 13, 2007, a video was aired to the public, an exclusive interview with a leader of the ANA patrolling in the covert areas of North Kosovo, recruiting 20 new men. The leader stated that ANA stands at 12,000 men altogether and has called the Kosovar population for a boycott of then-forthcoming elections.

The ANA had committed an attack on April 29, 2010, on the border between Kosovo and the Republic of Macedonia, in which a Macedonian policeman was killed. In the skirmish, one ANA fighter was injured.

In the year of 2015 the group has been removed from the list of terrorist groups. Despite this, in 2016 Albanian militiamen presenting themselves as the "21st Brigade" published a video showing their weapons and threatening to move through northern Albania and the Presevo Valley. They also mentioned that they had the support of the population and that they had hundreds of men.

See also
Kosovo Liberation Army
Liberation Army of Preševo, Medveđa and Bujanovac
National Liberation Army
Liberation Army of Chameria
Greater Albania
Albanian nationalism

Notes

References

External links
Status of Albanian National Army (Taken Question)

2001 establishments in the Republic of Macedonia
2001 insurgency in Macedonia
Albanian irredentism
Albanian militant groups
Albanian nationalism in Kosovo
Albanian nationalism in Serbia
Albanian nationalism in North Macedonia
Albanian separatism
Nationalist terrorism in Europe
Organizations established in 2001
Paramilitary organizations in the Yugoslav Wars
Secessionist organizations in Europe
Specially Designated Nationals and Blocked Persons List